In New Zealand folklore, the moehau (also called the maeroero) is a creature said to dwell in the Coromandel-Moehau ranges of New Zealand's North Island.  Some Māori people suggest that the creature is a descendant of the maero, but another explanation for the moehau is that it was an exaggerated report of an escaped gorilla.

However, in 1970, County Councillor J. Reddy told Robyn Gosset that the Hairy Moehau was an exaggeration started from a joke. Also in 1970, Bob Grey told researcher Robyn Gosset that the term Moehau Monster came from a name given to a Yankee steam hauler that was utilized for logging.

See also
Maero
Patupaiarehe
The Catlins

References

Further reading

Coromandel Peninsula
New Zealand legendary creatures